DC Super Hero Girls: Intergalactic Games is an American animated direct-to-video superhero film based on the DC Super Hero Girls franchise, produced by Warner Bros. Animation. It is the second film in the DC Super Hero Girls franchise. It was digitally released on 9 May 2017 and was followed by a DVD release on 23 May 2017. Superheroines Wonder Woman, Supergirl, Batgirl, Poison Ivy, Harley Quinn, Bumblebee, and Katana all square off against Korugar Academy in the Intergalactic Games. But trouble is in the air as Lena Luthor takes advantage of the gathering of the Supers to enact her villainous plan.

Plot
Supergirl, Bumblebee and Batgirl are all excited for the Intergalactic Games and win the championship for Super Hero High. However, they are interrupted by a call for help in the city. Supergirl, Bumblebee and Batgirl investigate to find humans being attacked by three robots; two male and one female called Platinum. With the arrival of Starfire, the robotic trio give Batgirl an idea to magnetize them. At Super Hero High School, it is revealed that Platinum and her cronies were part of an experiment to give machines more human emotion and free will, to make them superheroes as well.

Cast

 Yvette Nicole Brown as Principal Waller
 Greg Cipes as Beast Boy/Iron 
 Romi Dames as Lena Luthor
 Jessica DiCicco as Star Sapphire / Lashina
 John DiMaggio as Ambassador Bek
 Teala Dunn as Bumblebee / Artemiz
 Anais Fairweather as Supergirl
 Nika Futterman as Hawkgirl
 Grey Griffin as Wonder Woman / Platinum
 Julianne Grossman as Hippolyta / Mongal
 Tania Gunadi as Lady Shiva
 Josh Keaton as Flash / Steve Trevor
 Tom Kenny as Sinestro / Lobo
 Phil LaMarr as Doc Magnus
 Misty Lee as Big Barda / Mad Harriet
 Danica McKellar as Frost
 Khary Payton as Cyborg / Lead
 Stephanie Sheh as Katana / Bleez
 April Stewart as Granny Goodness / Stompa
 Tara Strong as Harley Quinn / Poison Ivy
 Fred Tatasciore as Brainiac / Kryptomites
 Anna Vocino as Oracle
 Hynden Walch as Starfire and Blackfire 
 Mae Whitman as Barbara Gordon / Batgirl / Speed Queen
 Alexis G. Zall as Lois Lane

References

External links

2017 direct-to-video films
2017 animated films
2010s animated superhero films
2010s high school films
DC Super Hero Girls films
Direct-to-video animated films based on DC Comics
2010s superhero comedy films
2010s American animated films
2010s direct-to-video animated superhero films
American children's animated adventure films
American children's animated comedy films
American children's animated fantasy films
American direct-to-video films
American children's animated superhero films
American fantasy adventure films
Animated teen superhero comedy films
Warner Bros. Animation animated films
Warner Bros. direct-to-video films
Warner Bros. direct-to-video animated films
American high school films
Films directed by Cecilia Aranovich
2010s English-language films